Muza Alekseýewna Niýazowa; born 10 June 1938) is a Turkmen public figure who held the role of First Lady of Turkmenistan from 1991 until the death of her husband in 2006.
She is the widow of the first president of Turkmenistan, Saparmyrat Nyýazow, with whom she had two children.

Biography 
Muza Melnikova was born in Leningrad into a family of Russian and Jewish origin. Her father fought in the Great Patriotic War and was a senior officer in Soviet Army. She graduated from the Leningrad Polytechnic Institute. In the mid-1960s, she met Saparmyrat Nyýazow, who at that time worked at the Kirov plant as a molder and was studying at the institute at the same time, and soon she married him. On 18 April 1967, Niýazowa gave birth to a son, Murat, and two years later to their daughter, Irina.

Wife to Nyýazow 
It was understood that when Nyýazow was appointed in 1985 as First Secretary of the Central Committee of the Communist Party of Turkmenistan, Niýazowa's nationality played a decisive role, as members of the Politburo considered that it would force a cap on Turkmen nationalism. Following the collapse of the Soviet government and the 1990 Turkmenistan presidential election, Nyýazow distanced himself from Muza as he did not care to become an example of interethnic marriages in a position of power. In Niýazowa's later years, she spent most of her time between Moscow (where she has an apartment on Prospekt Vernadskogo) and London.

References 

1938 births
Living people
People from Saint Petersburg
First Ladies of Turkmenistan
Soviet Jews
Russian Jews
Saparmyrat Nyýazow